Marquis Spruill (born May 14, 1991) is a former American football linebacker. He was drafted by the Atlanta Falcons in the fifth round of the 2014 NFL Draft.  He played college football at Syracuse. He was also a member of the Toronto Argonauts.

Raised in Hillside, New Jersey, Spruill played prep football at Hillside High School and did a post-graduate year at Fork Union Military Academy after he didn't receive a scholarship offer as a senior at Hillside.

Collegiate career
Spruill attended Syracuse University and played Division 1 football in the Big East and later in the ACC. Spruill recorded 243 tackles, including 41 for a loss (second most in program history), three forced fumbles, a fumble recovery and four pass defenses. During his four-year college career, he was a 2011 All-BIG EAST Second-team selection and 2013 All-ACC Honorable mention.

Professional career

Atlanta Falcons 
The Atlanta Falcons became interested in Spruill as they looked to add depth to the inside linebacker position. They traded their 2014 sixth and seventh round draft picks to the Minnesota Vikings, to move up and select him in the fifth round. Spruill injured his left knee (torn ACL) on August 6, 2014, ending his rookie season. He was placed on injured reserve and Atlanta Falcons Team Physician Dr. Spero Karas performed reconstructive knee surgery. The surgery was filmed and shown on HBO series Hard Knocks as the opening segment on the 3rd episode of the 2014 season. On August 24, 2015, the Falcons released Spruill.

Toronto Argonauts 
On April 4, 2016, the Toronto Argonauts of the Canadian Football League announced they had signed Spruill. Spruill was released on June 14, 2016.

References

1991 births
Living people
American football linebackers
Canadian football linebackers
African-American players of American football
African-American players of Canadian football
Atlanta Falcons players
Toronto Argonauts players
Hillside High School (New Jersey) alumni
People from Hillside, New Jersey
Players of American football from Newark, New Jersey
Players of Canadian football from Newark, New Jersey
Sportspeople from Union County, New Jersey
Syracuse Orange football players
21st-century African-American sportspeople